Paradoris is a genus of sea slugs, dorid nudibranchs, shell-less marine gastropod mollusks in the family Discodorididae.

Species 
Species in the genus Paradoris include:
 Paradoris adamsae Padula & Valdés, 2012
 Paradoris annularis Ortea, Espinosa & Moro, 2017
 Paradoris araneosa Valdés, 2001
 Paradoris caerulea Camacho-García & Gosliner, 2007
 Paradoris ceneris Ortea, 1995
 Paradoris dubia (Bergh, 1904)
 Paradoris erythraeensis (Vayssière, 1912)
 Paradoris hypocrita Yonow, 2020
 Paradoris imperfecta Valdés, 2001
 Paradoris indecora (Bergh, 1881)
 Paradoris inversa Ortea, 1995
 Paradoris liturata (Bergh, 1905)
 Paradoris lopezi Hermosillo & Valdés, 2004
 Paradoris mollis Ortea, 1995
 Paradoris mulciber (Ev. Marcus, 1971)
 Paradoris tsurugensis Baba, 1986
Species brought into synonymy
 Paradoris caeruleus Camacho-García & Gosliner, 2007: synonym of Paradoris caerulea Camacho-García & Gosliner, 2007 (wrong grammatical agreement of specific epithet)
 Paradoris cavernae Starmülhner, 1955: synonym of Paradoris indecora (Bergh, 1881) 
 Paradoris granulata Bergh, 1884: synonym of Paradoris indecora (Bergh, 1881)
 Paradoris leuca Miller 1995: synonym of Paradoris dubia (Bergh, 1904)
 Nomen dubium
 Paradoris lora (Marcus, 1965) (nomen dubium)

References

 Marcus Ev. du B.-R. (1971 ["1970"]). Opisthobranchs from northern Brazil. Bulletin of Marine Science. 20: 922-951
 Valdés Á. (2002). A phylogenetic analysis and systematic revision of the cryptobranch dorids (Mollusca, Nudibranchia, Anthobranchia). Zoological Journal of the Linnean Society. 136: 535-636.
 Dayrat B. (2006). A taxonomic revision of Paradoris sea slugs (Mollusca, Gastropoda, Nudibranchia, Doridina).. Zoological Journal of the Linnean Society 147: 125-238

External links 
  Dayrat B. 2010. A monographic revision of discodorid sea slugs (Gastropoda, Opisthobranchia, Nudibranchia, Doridina). Proceedings of the California Academy of Sciences, Series 4, vol. 61, suppl. I, 1-403, 382 figs.
 Bergh, L. S. R. (1884). Malacologische Untersuchungen. In: Semper C, ed. Reisen im Archipel der Philippinen. theil 3, heft 15. Wiesbaden: Kreidel, 647–754, plates 69–76

Discodorididae